Plopii-Slăvitești is a commune in Teleorman County, Muntenia, Romania. It is composed of three villages: Brâncoveanca, Dudu and Plopii-Slăvitești. It included three other villages until 2004, when they were split off to form Beciu Commune.

References

Communes in Teleorman County
Localities in Muntenia